Nathan's Department Store is a historic department store building located at Johnstown, Cambria County, Pennsylvania.  It was built in 1917, and is a four-story brick building with a finished basement.  The front facade features glazed architectural terra cotta in a simplified classical motif.  The building was damaged in the Flood of 1977.  For many years the building housed an S. S. Kresge store.

It was added to the National Register of Historic Places in 1979. It is located in the Downtown Johnstown Historic District.

References

Defunct department stores based in Pennsylvania
Commercial buildings on the National Register of Historic Places in Pennsylvania
Commercial buildings completed in 1893
Buildings and structures in Johnstown, Pennsylvania
Department stores on the National Register of Historic Places
National Register of Historic Places in Cambria County, Pennsylvania
Individually listed contributing properties to historic districts on the National Register in Pennsylvania